Leander Paes and David Rikl were the defending champions, but chose not to participate that year.

Yves Allegro and Roger Federer won in the final 7–5, 6–7(6–8), 6–3, against Joachim Johansson and Marat Safin.

Seeds

Draw

Draw

External links
 Draw

Doubles